Jiva is the immortal essence of a living organism in Hinduism and Jainism.

Jiva, Jīva, or Jiwa may also refer to:

 Jīva (Jainism), the soul substance in Jainism
 Jīvá, a Sanskrit trigonometric term also known as jyā; see Jyā, koti-jyā and utkrama-jyā
 JIVA!, a 2021 drama TV series on Netflix

People
 Jīva (nun) (fl. 4th century CE), sister of a king of Kucha, and Buddhist nun
 Jiva Goswami (1513–1598), philosopher and saint from the Gaudiya Vaishnava school of Vedanta Tradition
 Prakash Jiwa (born 1970), British Indian darts player
 Jiva Pandu Gavit, Indian politician

See also
 Jeeva (disambiguation)